Fred Solm (22 January 1899 – 1982) was an Austrian actor, director and screenwriter.

Selected filmography
 U 9 Weddigen (1927)
 Die Lindenwirtin am Rhein (1927)
 The Champion of the World (1927)
 The Famous Woman (1927)
 Linden Lady on the Rhine (1927)
 U-9 Weddigen (1927)
 Mein Leben für das Deine (1928)
 The Great Adventuress (1928)
  Dyckerpotts' Heirs (1928)
 Number 17 (1928)
 Odette (1928)
 When the Guard Marches (1928)
 Marianne (1929)
 Adventure in Vienna (1952)

Bibliography
 Jung, Uli & Schatzberg, Walter. Beyond Caligari: The Films of Robert Wiene. Berghahn Books, 1999.

External links

Austrian male film actors
Austrian male silent film actors
People from Jihlava
20th-century Austrian male actors
1899 births
1982 deaths